Gannat is a canton of the Allier department, Auvergne-Rhône-Alpes, France. At the French canton reorganisation which came into effect in March 2015, the canton was expanded from 12 to 41 communes:
 
Barberier
Bègues
Bellenaves
Biozat
Chantelle
Chareil-Cintrat
Charmes
Charroux
Chezelle
Chirat-l'Église
Chouvigny
Coutansouze
Deneuille-lès-Chantelle
Ébreuil
Échassières
Étroussat
Fleuriel
Fourilles
Gannat
Jenzat
Lalizolle
Louroux-de-Bouble
Le Mayet-d'École
Mazerier
Monestier
Monteignet-sur-l'Andelot
Nades
Naves
Poëzat
Saint-Bonnet-de-Rochefort
Saint-Germain-de-Salles
Saint-Priest-d'Andelot
Saulzet  
Sussat
Target
Taxat-Senat
Ussel-d'Allier
Valignat
Veauce
Vicq
Voussac

See also
Cantons of the Allier department

References

Gannat